Dealogic is a financial markets platform offering integrated content, analytics, and technology via a service to financial firms. From origination to distribution and investors, the Dealogic platform provides a connection across banking, capital markets, sales and trading, and institutional investing. The company has offices located in London, New York, Hong Kong, Tokyo, Budapest, Sydney, Mumbai, São Paulo, and Beijing.

History 
Dealogic was founded in 1983 in the United Kingdom by Simon Hessell, Peter Ogden, and Philip Hulme. The current chief executive, Tom Fleming, came to Dealogic in 1991 when it acquired the assets of U.S. capital markets communications business Graphic Scanning Corp.

In 2009, the company acquired the investor profiles products of Ilios Partners LLC.

In 2013, the company acquired Junction RDS, the leader in ownership analysis of UK listed companies.

In 2014, global alternative asset manager The Carlyle Group, and co-investors Euromoney Institutional Investor and Randall Winn acquired Dealogic.

In 2015, Dealogic acquired A2 Access, the market leader in corporate access aggregation.

In 2017, ION Investment Group recapitalized Dealogic.

Services 
Dealogic content is used by global financial publications for analysis of investment banking trends, activity, and wallet share. The company provides information to a number media companies, most notably The Wall Street Journal Investment Banking Scorecard, an interactive and real-time scorecard of the world's financial markets.

References 

Companies established in 1983
Companies based in the City of London
Financial news agencies
Financial data vendors
Mass media companies based in London
News agencies based in the United Kingdom
Privately held companies based in London